C. vulgaris may refer to:
 Calluna vulgaris ([common] heather), the sole species within the genus Calluna
 Carlina vulgaris, a thistle species
 Chara vulgaris, a green alga species
 Crupina vulgaris, a daisy species

Synonyms
 Crago vulgaris or Crangon vulgaris, synonyms for Crangon crangon, a shrimp species

See also
 Vulgaris (disambiguation)